The 2021 Inter-Provincial Cup was the ninth edition of the Inter-Provincial Cup, a List A cricket competition that took place in Ireland during 2021. It was the fifth edition of the competition to be played with List A status. The number of teams was increased from three to four, with Munster Reds playing in the tournament for the first time. On 25 March 2021, Cricket Ireland confirmed the fixtures for the tournament. On 9 April 2021, Cricket Ireland announced the revised fixtures for the tournament.

Leinster Lightning were the defending champions. Leinster Lightning retained their title, winning four of their six matches.

Points table

Fixtures

References

External links
 Series home at ESPN Cricinfo

Interprovincial Cup
Inter-Provincial Cup seasons